Kalikkalam is a 1990 Indian Malayalam-language action thriller film, directed by Sathyan Anthikad, starring Mammootty, Shobana and Murali. the film was major commercial success.

Plot
Mammootty, who is an orphan, plays the role of a burglar who is known by different names (Shankar / Antony / Tony Louis / Gauthaman / Pappan / Vasudevan / Ramakrishnan) in different places. He is a kind person and uses the illegal money he has burgled to help the poor and orphans.

In the beginning, he fakes himself as an Income Tax officer Sankar and raids a jewellery with the help of a newly posted police officer Shekhar, and takes the illegal gold along with him. Later, on knowing that he has been cheated, Shekhar sets out to put the Sankar behind the bars. He use various methods to trap him, but all go in vain. In between, we could see the good deeds that the burglar does with the stolen money.

In the process, he (Pappan) befriends Jamal, who is a poor chap. Pappan helps Jamal financially too.

After giving a hint to the police about his next target, Gauthaman loots the finance institution (Gopuram) owned by Devassy, where minister Velayil Chandy had deposited his illegal money. Though there was police protection for the institution, Gauthaman cleverly executes his plan and escapes with the money.

On the parallel, a romance story between Mammootty's character (Tony Louis) and a young Christian girl, Annie, also gets progressed in between. He fakes himself as a Customs officer to Annie.

Faking as Ramakrishnan, he busts out a drug group and sends over the drug to Shekhar's office. However, he takes the money involved in that deal himself.

Tracing the location of the phone calls made, Shekhar traced the residence of Sankar. However, Sankar escapes by a whisker.

S. I. Shekhar's indifference with one of the Abkari contractor cum newspaper publisher Ambalakkadan(Ambalakkadu Krishnan) creates problems, as false news regarding the SI and also his family gets published in the newspaper. Shekhar slaps Ambalakkadan for this, which ultimately leads to his suspension.

As Annie takes the romance seriously, Tony finally reveals his actual identity and moves away from her life.

Situations make Shekhar falsely accused as the murderer of Ambalakkadan, and Shekhar is sent to jail. At this stage, only Sankar can help Shekharan to prove his innocence. For this, Sankar had to confess his crimes and surrender in front of the law.

Reception
N.Krishnaswamy of The Indian Express, in a February 22, 1991 review, wrote that the film is "assured of theatrical outlets, and can afford to be what it is, and all that".

Cast

 Mammootty as Burglar with several names 
 Murali as CI Shekharan, sincere police officer
 Shobana as  Annie
 Sreenivasan as Jamal
 Lalu Alex as Commissioner Mathews
 C. I. Paul as Ambalakkadu Krishnan
 Mamukkoya as Unni Nair, police constable 
 Sukumari as Jamal's Mother
 Innocent as Velayil Chandy  
 Chitra as Ramani
 Philomina as Janakiamma
 Oduvil Unnikrishnan as Devassy
 Sankaradi as Ammavan 
 T. P. Madhavan as Thomas, Jewellery store owner
 Bheeman Raghu as Jose
 Santhakumari as Rosie, Devassy's wife
 Azeez as Annie's father
 Karamana Janardhanan Nair as Advocate Aravindan
 Thesni Khan as Suhra
 Shari as Meera Nair
 Paravoor Bharathan as Krishnettan
 P. C. George as Ravi
 James as George
 Kaladi Jayan as P. C. Bhaskar

Production 
Swamy developed the story with some subtexts from Kayamkulam Kochunni and Robin Hood. Sathyan Anthikad had liked Adikkurippu (1989) and its main character, Bhaskara Pillai and asked Swamy to develop a character like that of Adv. Bhaskara Pillai from Adikkurippu.

Soundtrack
Music was composed by Johnson. Lyrics were written by Kaithapram.

Reception
N.Krishnaswamy of The Indian Express, in a February 22, 1991 review, wrote that the film is "assured of theatrical outlets, and can afford to be what it is, and all that".

References

External links
 
 Kalikkalam at the Malayalam Movie Database

1990s Malayalam-language films
Films scored by Johnson
Indian gangster films
Films directed by Sathyan Anthikad